Dichomeris lutea is a moth in the family Gelechiidae. It was described by Park Kyu-Tek and Ronald W. Hodges in 1995. It is found in Taiwan.

The wingspan is about 10 mm. The forewings are orange, but pale orange along the anterior margin. There is a large dark brown discal spot near the end of the cell, a small spot before the middle of the cell, a narrow brown postmedial fascia, as well as four or five dark brown stigmata along the termen. The hindwings are grey.

References

lutea
Moths of Taiwan
Moths described in 1995